The 1984 season of the Tongatapu Inter Club Championship was the 11th season of top flight association football competition in Tonga. Ngeleʻia FC won the championship for the third time, their third title in a then-record of 7 consecutive championships.

Standings

References

Tonga Major League seasons
Tonga
Football